This is a list of MPs who lost their seat at the 2017 French legislative election. All of these députés sat in the 14th legislature of the French Fifth Republic but were not returned to Parliament in the elections. In total, incumbent 206 members of the National Assembly were defeated in the landslide victory of Emmanuel Macron and La République En Marche!. 75% of all Members of Parliament elected to the National Assembly are newcomers.

List

References

See also 

 List of MPs who lost their seat in the 2022 French legislative election

2017 French legislative election
Lists of French MPs who were defeated by election